Billie Peak is a peak,  high, which rises  east-northeast of Bay Point on the southeast coast of Anvers Island, in the Palmer Archipelago. It was discovered by the Belgian Antarctic Expedition, 1897–99, under Gerlache. The name appears on a chart based on a 1927 Discovery Investigations survey, but may reflect an earlier naming.

References 

Mountains of the Palmer Archipelago